Metanoia is the sixth studio album by IAMX, released on 2 October 2015, almost four months after its album title official announcement on 11 June 2015 on the band's PledgeMusic page.

The first single from the album, "Happiness", was released digitally on 19 June 2015.

The second single, "Oh Cruel Darkness Embrace Me", was released on 25 September 2015.

Two tracks from the album were featured in the second season of the TV series How to Get Away with Murder, viz., "Happiness" in episode 1 and "Insomnia" in episode 14. "Surrender" also appeared on the ninth episode of the third season. "Look Outside" would also appear on episode fifteen, the season finale, of the third season.

Track listing 
 ″No Maker Made Me″ - 4:00
 "Happiness" - 3:48
 "North Star" - 4:23
 "Say Hello Melancholia" - 4:37
 "The Background Noise" - 3:38
 "Insomnia" - 4:41
 "Look Outside" - 3:21
 "Oh Cruel Darkness Embrace Me" - 3:12
 "Aphrodisiac" - 4:10
 "Surrender" - 3:42
 "Wildest Wind" - 4:47

Charts

References

IAMX albums
2015 albums